The 2013 DRIVE4COPD 300 was a NASCAR Nationwide Series race held on February 23, 2013 at Daytona International Speedway in Daytona Beach, Florida. It was the first race of the 2013 NASCAR Nationwide Series season. Sam Hornish Jr. finished second and Alex Bowman finished third.

Race
The race was marred by two crashes. On lap 116, 11 cars were involved in the first one, which led to Michael Annett suffering a bruised sternum, which kept him out of the next eight races of the season. Jamie Dick, Johanna Long, and Hal Martin were also treated and were released. This crash brought out a 20-minute red flag. The second crash occurred on the final lap. This one started when Regan Smith got turned while trying to block Brad Keselowski. Kyle Larson, who was collected in the crash, got the worst of it, as his car went airborne into the catchfence, ripping out everything from its firewall forward, except for the hood, most of which flew into the grandstand (including its engine and both wheels), as did some debris into the second level. Ultimately, 28 fans were injured, with two of them in critical condition. In the midst of the chaos, Tony Stewart escaped the wreck, and won the race, tying Dale Earnhardt for the most Nationwide Series wins at the track with seven. Alex Bowman; Dale Earnhardt Jr.; and Parker Kligerman closed out the Top 5 while Brian Scott, Justin Allgaier, Eric McClure; Robert Richardson Jr.; and Travis Pastrana rounded out the Top 10.

Much of the tragedy was due to the car hitting a crossover gate in the catch fence, where the fence is not as strong. In the aftermath of the incident, Daytona and Talladega Superspeedway added cables and tethers to the crossover gates, with Daytona's being installed in time for the Sprint Cup Series' Coke Zero 400 in July. The crash also resulted in the banning of the two-car tandem that had been prevalent since the 2011 introduction of the new cars. This rule change came into effect for the 2014 seasons of all three national touring series.

The picture of Larson's car getting shredded by the catch fence remains as one of the most well-known and reproduced images in the sport's history.

Results

Standings after the race

References

External links
 NASCAR settles with fan injured in race at Daytona International Speedway (The Daytona Beach News-Journal, Feb 7, 2017)
 USAF Thunderbirds, Daytona 2013 - More Than a Flyover (YouTube, posted May 3, 2013)
 Thunderbird 9, Maj. Michael Carletti (YouTube, NASCAR Feature for ESPN, posted July 4, 2013)

DRIVE4COPD 300
NASCAR races at Daytona International Speedway
February 2013 sports events in the United States
2013 NASCAR Nationwide Series